Cheng Li is a Chinese-American scholar specializing in Chinese elite politics and contemporary Chinese society; he has served as the director of the John L. Thornton China Center at the Brookings Institution since 2014, replacing Kenneth Lieberthal in the role. Li is a prominent authority on Chinese politics, specifically leadership dynamics and the changes in leaders over generations.

Early life and education

Li grew up in the city of Shanghai during the Cultural Revolution, and was at one point a barefoot doctor in his community. He is a graduate of East China Normal University. In 1985, he came to the United States for graduate studies at the University of California, Berkeley. He later received a Ph.D. from Princeton University.

At University of California, Berkeley, Li studied under the well-known scholar Robert Scalapino, and was mentored by the veteran China watcher A. Doak Barnett.

Career

From 1993 to 1995, he worked in China as a fellow with the U.S.-based Institute of Current World Affairs, observing grassroots changes in his native country. Based on this experience, he published a nationally acclaimed book, Rediscovering China: Dynamics and Dilemmas of Reform (1997).

Li has written notably about the rise of "technocrats" in Chinese leadership circles. A portion of his research is informed by a large databank he had accumulated about Chinese leaders and their relations with one another.

Li has advised a wide range of government, business and non-profit organizations on working in China. He is a director of the National Committee on U.S.-China Relations, a member of the Academic Advisory Group of the Congressional U.S.-China Working Group, a member of the Council on Foreign Relations and a director of the Committee of 100. Before joining Brookings in 2006, he was the William R. Kenan professor of government at Hamilton College, where he had taught since 1991.

Li has been a recipient of fellowships or research grants from the Smith Richardson Foundation, the Freeman Foundation, the Peter Lewis Foundation, the Crane-Rogers Foundation, the Emerson Foundation, the United States Institute of Peace, Hong Kong Institute of Humanities and Social Sciences and the Chiang Ching-Kuo Foundation for International Scholarly Exchange. From 2002 to 2003, he was a residential fellow of the Woodrow Wilson International Center for Scholars.

He is frequently called on to share his unique perspective and insights as an expert on China. He has recently appeared on CNN, C-SPAN, BBC, ABC World News with Diane Sawyer, PBS NewsHour, Charlie Rose, Foreign Exchange with Fareed Zakaria and NPR's Diane Rehm Show. He has been featured in The New York Times, The Washington Post, The Wall Street Journal, Time magazine, The Economist, Newsweek, Business Week, Foreign Policy magazine and numerous other publications. Li is also a columnist for the Stanford University journal China Leadership Monitor. He is a regular speaker and participant at the Bilderberg Conference.

Affiliations 
 21st Century International Review, member, editorial board
 Asia Policy, member, editorial board
 China Leadership Monitor, Hoover Institution, Stanford University, columnist
 China's Rising Leaders Project, National Bureau of Asian Research, co-chair, advisory committee
 Committee of 100, member and co-chair, issue committee
 Council on Foreign Relations, member
 Institute of Current World Affairs, trustee
 Journal of Public Management, member, editorial board
 National Committee on United States-China Relations, member, board of directors
 The China Report, India, member, editorial board

Publications 
 Thornton Center Chinese Thinkers Series, principal editor (ongoing)
 Middle Class Shanghai Reshaping U.S.-China Engagement (2021)
 The Power of Ideas: The Rising Influence of Thinkers and Think Tanks in China (2017)
 Chinese Politics in the Xi Jinping Era: Reassessing Collective Leadership (2016)
 China's Political Development: Chinese and American Perspectives (2014, co-author)
 The Political Mapping of China’s Tobacco Industry and Anti-Smoking Campaign (2012)
 The Road to Zhongnanhai: High-Level Leadership Groups on the Eve of the 18th Party Congress (in Chinese, 2012)
 China's Emerging Middle Class: Beyond Economic Transformation (2010, ed.)
 China's Changing Political Landscape: Prospects for Democracy (2008)
 Bridging Minds Across the Pacific: The Sino-U.S. Educational Exchange 1978-2003 (2005)
 China's Leaders: The New Generation (2001)
 Rediscovering China: Dynamics and Dilemmas of Reform (1997)

Bibliography

Li is also the author or the editor of numerous books, including

China's Leaders: The New Generation (2001)
Bridging Minds Across the Pacific: The Sino-U.S. Educational Exchange 1978-2003 (2005)
China's Changing Political Landscape: Prospects for Democracy (2008)
China's Emerging Middle Class: Beyond Economic Transformation (2010)
The Road to Zhongnanhai: High-Level Leadership Groups on the Eve of the 18th Party Congress (in Chinese, 2012) 
The Political Mapping of China's Tobacco Industry and Anti-Smoking Campaign (2012)
Chinese Politics in the Xi Jinping Era: Reassessing Collective Leadership (2016)
The Power of Ideas: The Rising Influence of Thinkers and Think Tanks in China (2017)
Middle Class Shanghai: Pioneering China's Global Integration (Manuscript)

He is the principal editor of the Thornton Center Chinese Thinkers Series published by the Brookings Institution Press.

References

External links

Chinese emigrants to the United States
Living people
Year of birth missing (living people)
Writers from Shanghai
Hamilton College (New York) faculty
University of California, Berkeley alumni
Princeton University alumni
East China Normal University alumni
20th-century Chinese physicians